Ribadesella Club de Fútbol is a Spanish football team based in Ribadesella, in the autonomous community of Asturias. Founded in 1949, it plays in Primera Regional – Group 1, holding home games at Estadio Oreyana, with a capacity of 3,500 seats.

History
Founded in 1949, Ribadesella always played in the regional divisions until 1988, when the club promoted for the first time to Tercera División after finishing in the third position of the Regional Preferente.

Fourteen years later, the club achieved the promotion to Segunda División B after qualifying for the first time to the promotion play-offs. Ribadesella topped its group over San Sebastián de los Reyes, Betanzos CF and Gimnástica Segoviana.

The club only remained one season in the third tier before being relegated again to Tercera División, where it played eight more years before suffering two relegations in two years. Ribadesella came back to Regional Preferente in 2016, after spending four seasons in the sixth tier and leaving a high economic debt.

Season to season

1 season in Segunda División B
22 seasons in Tercera División

Notable former coaches
 Nené Ballina
 Josu Uribe

References

External links
Futbolme.com profile 
Futbolenasturias team profile 

Football clubs in Asturias
Association football clubs established in 1949
Divisiones Regionales de Fútbol clubs
1949 establishments in Spain